Hans Vogt may refer to:

 Hans Vogt (engineer) (1890–1979), German engineer and one of the inventors of the Tri-Ergon sound-on-film technology
 Hans Vogt (linguist) (1903–1986), Norwegian linguist
 Hans Vogt (composer) (1911–1992), German composer and conductor
 Hans Vogt, Sr., German sailor in 1972 Star World Championships
 Hans Vogt, Jr., German sailor